SM U-138 was one of the 329 submarines serving in the Imperial German Navy in World War I.
U-138 was engaged in the naval warfare and took part in the First Battle of the Atlantic.

References

Notes

Citations

Bibliography

World War I submarines of Germany
1917 ships
U-boats commissioned in 1918
Type U 127 submarines
Ships built in Danzig